The Catholic German student fraternity Alania-Bonn (CV) is a non-fencing, colour-wearing, catholic fraternity located in Bonn, Germany. It was founded on 1 March 1905 as Unitas Alania and became a member of the Cartellverband in 1910.

Principles 

Virtus: The courage to stand up for the virtues and traditions of the fraternity and to defend them.

Scientia: The love for science.

Amicitia: Lifelong friendship between members.

The Words of the Alania are : "Einig und Treu!" (United and true).

Colours 
The members of the Alania wear "blue-gold-white" ribbons over their chest. New member ("Füxe") wear "blue-gold". The traditional headpiece for the Alania is a yellow hat. The colors of the fraternity ribbon go back to the colors of the Unitas Association, but were given new meaning for joining the CV, with blue and white representing the Blessed Virgin Mary and gold representing the Vatican. Blue pub jackets and lemon yellow plate caps are worn with the ribbons, and in rare cases yellow silk strikers (although these have been abolished twice in the course of the fraternity's history).

History

Foundation 
The KDStV Alania-Bonn was founded in 1905 as Unitas Alania, because the mother corporation WKStV Unitas Salia had to register an unexpectedly high number of newly received foxes, whereupon the Alania founders Wilhelm Rombach and Wilhelm Lamberty made the request to divide the Salia and thus to found a new corporation. The name Alania goes back to an Iranian steppe people. In August of the same year, the Alania was officially admitted to the Unitas Association.

Leaving the UV & joining the CV 
On 30 October 1906, the Burschenconvent of the Alania decided to introduce blue pub jackets for the Füxe. This contradicted the statute of the Unitas federation not to wear colors, thus triggering the so-called "first Unitas crisis". Due to the following disputes, the Alania resigned from the UV on 15 August 1908.

As a newly constituted KDStV Alania and with the newly chosen motto "Einig und Treu" (United and Faithful), the Alania joined the CV on 21 August 1910, to which it still belongs today.

20th century 
During the First World War the fraternity was largely dormant, with 28 Alans falling victim to it. In 1918, a new house was purchased at Weberstrasse 23, which, with interruptions, remains the headquarters of the fraternity to this day.

During the occupation of the Rhineland, in the course of which the just acquired house of the Alania was confiscated, there were some violent clashes between Alans and the occupying forces. These clashes resulted, among other things, in a color ban, which is why Bonn Alans subsequently wore a yellow carnation in their lapel.

After the seizure of power by Adolf Hitler, there were many discussions about the maintenance of the fraternity. Despite numerous reprisals, the fraternity existed until 1936. Later in 1940, an underground fraternity Conrübia (later Coronia) was founded together with members of the K.D.St.V. Novesia Bonn.

Shortly after the end of World War 2, fraternity operations were resumed in 1946. After the house in the Weberstrasse was sold shortly before the expropriation and the Alanen resided from 1952 temporarily in the Arndtstrasse 5, they got back their house in the Weberstrasse in 1959.

Foundation of the Borusso-Westfalia 
On 16 November 1927, the Alania, together with members of the KDStV Bavaria Bonn, founded the subsidiary corporation Borusso-Guestphalia (later renamed Borusso-Westfalia)[8]. Since 2005, the Senior Alaniae wears the ribbon of honor of Borusso-Westfalia as a cross ribbon and vice versa.

Suspension and reestablishment 
Due to financial and personnel problems, the Alania was unable to provide a senior in 2000 and was consequently suspended. However, the Altherrenschaft remained in existence, which is why the Alania was officially re-established in 2002 and was able to resume regular operations in the following years.

Alania in the CV 
In 2008 Alania provided the suburb president together with Staufia, Novesia and Borusso-Westfalia. In 2022 Alania provided the suburb together with Novesia, Bavaria and Ripuaria. The Alania is co-founder and part of the movement "CV 2025", which wants to reorient the Cartellverband.

Cooperation with "BonnAir" 
In the course of the Bonner Vorort 2022, the Alania provided the press officer Daniel Burkhardt, who founded the "student podcast" BonnAir together with the suburb president David Dekorsi. BonnAir broadcast its first episode on 14 January 2022, and has since been able to interview Joachim Herrmann, Michael Vetter, and Wolfgang Schäuble, among others

Well-known members 

 Ludwig Kaas (1881-1952), chairman of the Center Party
 Wilhelm Rombach (1884-1973), district president and mayor of Aachen
 Franz Böckle (1921-1991), rector of the Rheinische Friedrich-Wilhelms-Universität Bonn from 1983 to 1985
 Anselm Hertz OP (born 1924), Dominican friar, professor at the Pontifical University of Saint Thomas Aquinas (Angelicum)
 Stephan Liermann (born 1929), District Court President LG Düsseldorf
 Herbert Ottersbach (born 1930), President of the Federal Language Office (BSprA)
 Klaus Doberschütz (born 1932), government spokesman
 Klaus Peter Rauen (born 1935), Lord Mayor of the city of Halle / Saale from 1991 to 2000
 Egbert Bülles (born 1946), Cologne senior public prosecutor
 Matthias Wissmann (born 1949), President of the German Association of the Automotive Industry, former Federal Minister (honorary member)
 Heiner Koch (born 1954), auxiliary bishop in the archdiocese of Cologne (honorary member)
 Hans Pixa (born 1954), Chief District Administrator 1992 to 1999, full-time District Administrator of Coesfeld from 1999 to 2004
 Dirk Wentzel (born 1961), economist, holder of the Jean Monnet Chair in European Economic Relations
 Jörg Krämer (born 1966), Chief Economist of Commerzbank AG

References 

Cartellverband
Student organizations established in 1905
1905 establishments in Prussia